Westfield Mall of Scandinavia is a shopping mall located in Solna in Stockholm, Sweden. About 20-25% of the leasable area is dedicated to experiences, including 22 restaurants and a 15 screen multiplex with the first purpose-built commercial IMAX theatre in the Nordic region (and also the second overall IMAX theatre in Sweden after the Cosmonova planetarium at the Swedish Museum of Natural History). The building also house an additional  of office space and condominiums.  

The project cost is estimated at SEK 6,1 billion and the mall is owned by Unibail-Rodamco-Westfield with Peab as the main contractor. Located near the Solna commuter rail station, approximately seven minutes from the Stockholm city centre, and the E4 highway, it is part of the Arenastaden project, which includes  of new office space, the Friends national  football arena and 1,500 residential units.

In 2019, the mall was bought by Unibail-Rodamco-Westfield. The mall changed its name from Mall of Scandinavia to Westfield Mall of Scandinavia on September 28, 2019.

See also 
 List of shopping centres in Sweden
 List of largest shopping centres in the Nordic countries

References

External links

 
Unibail-Rodamco-Westfield - official website of the mall owner

Shopping centres in Sweden
Shopping malls established in 2015
IMAX venues
Solna Municipality
2015 establishments in Sweden
Buildings and structures in Stockholm County
Mall of Scandinavia